Cernavodă is a town in Constanța County, Northern Dobruja, Romania with a population of 20,514.

The town's name is derived from the Bulgarian černa voda (черна вода in Cyrillic), meaning 'black water'.  This name is regarded by some scholars as a calque of the earlier Thracian name Axíopa, from IE *n̥ksei 'dark' and upā 'water' (cf. Avestan axšaēna- 'dark' and Lithuanian ùpė 'river, creek').

Economy
The town is a Danube fluvial port. It houses the Cernavodă Nuclear Power Plant, consisting of two CANDU reactors providing about 18% of Romania's electrical energy output. The second reactor was built through a joint venture between Canada's Atomic Energy of Canada Limited and Italy's ANSALDO and became fully functional in November 2007.

The Danube-Black Sea Canal, opened in 1984, runs from Cernavodă to Agigea and Năvodari.

The outskirts of Cernavodă host numerous vineyards, producers of Chardonnay wine. The largest winery in the area is Murfatlar.

History

Cernavodă was founded (under the name Axiopolis) by the ancient Greeks in the 4th century BC as a trading post for contacts with local Dacians.

The railroad from Constanța to Cernavodă was opened in 1860 by the Ottoman administration.

Cernavodă was one of the capitals of the short-lived Silistra Nouă County (1878–1879).

The town gives its name to the late copper age Cernavodă archaeological culture, ca. 4000–3200 BC.

Demographics

At the 2011 census, Cernavodă had 14,969 Romanians (92.81%), 463 Turks (2.87%), 374 Roma (2.32%), 106 Lipovans (0.66%), 40 Tatars (0.25%), 15 Hungarians (0.09%) and 162 others.

Notable people born in Cernavodă include Alexandru Claudian (1898–1962) and Iosipos Moisiodax (1725–1800).

See also
 Cernavodă Nuclear Power Plant
 Anghel Saligny Bridge

References

External links

 Official site of the City of Cernavodă

Greek colonies in Scythia Minor
Towns in Romania
Populated places on the Danube
Port cities and towns in Romania
Populated places in Constanța County
Localities in Northern Dobruja
Place names of Slavic origin in Romania